The list of all the protagonist and antagonist robots, as well as vehicles and cyborgs, from the super robot anime Combattler V.

Combattler V
Height  57 Meters
Weight  550 Tons
Flight Speed  Mach 11
Components  Battle Jet (head), Battle Crusher (arms), Battle Tank (torso), Battle Marine (legs), and Battle Craft (feet)
Armor Component  Chogokin Alloy, making Combattler V extremely resilient to heat attacks, electric attacks, and explosions. It also allows absorption of magnetic energy.
Weapons:
Atomic Burner  Combattler V has a flamethrower from his hands.
Rock Fighter  Combattler can shoot missiles from his fingers.
Battle Guleggar  Combattler V can release a chain with metal collar from the arms, used for grabbing opponents by the neck.
Battle Returns  Combattler V can launch a pair of Frisbee from the ankle, to reach farther distance enemies.
Battle Chainsaws  Combattler V can launch tank treads on back armed with spikes.
Puls Shock  Combattler V can release purple electric bolts from its antennae.
V Laser  Used in the second half of the series, Combattler V can release purple energy Vs from the V on its forehead.
Super Electromagnetic (ChoDenji) Yo-Yo  Combattler V can release from the arms a pair of powerful yo-yos that are each equipped with a powerful buzzsaw.
Yo-Yo Double Cutter  When the yo-yos combine for a more powerful buzz saw attack.
Twin Lancer  Used in the second half of the series, Combatller V can release a blade in each shoulder to form a lance.
Big Blast  Combattler V can release a big yellow rocket from its stomach.
Big Blast Divider  Used in the second half of the series, Combattler V can release a giant blue rocket from its stomach. In this version, the rocket can also split into dozens of cluster missiles.
Magne Claw  Combattler V can release spiked blocks from its arms.
Super Electromagnetic (ChoDenji) Crane  Combattler V can release a spiked block which is connected to the arms with a wire.
V Laser  Used in the second half of the series, Combattler V summons sparks around his horns, and from the V crest on his forehead, he emits a V letter-shaped pink laser beam.
Cutter Kick  Used in the second half of the series, Combattler V can release a buzz saw on each ankle to make its normal kicks more effective.
Heat - Cold Lights  Combattler V emits pink-coloured heat rays from all his components. Those beams can even freeze the enemies.
Super Electromagnetic (ChoDenji) Spark  Combattler V summons lightning from its antennae and re-channels it through its hands towards enemies with great explosive force.
Super Electromagnetic (ChoDenji) Full Spark  Combattler V emits large amounts of heat from its body.
Grand Light Wave Rail and Grand Dasher  First used in episode 26, Combattler V can form a tangible energy trail from its chest, turn into a tank-like vehicle and ram down opponents.
Super Electromagnetic (ChoDenji) Hurricane (Tatsumaki) and Spin  Combattler V creates an energy tornado that keeps enemies in place for a short period of time. It will then spin extremely fast, turn its body into a large drill of lightning, and ram itself through opponents.
Other Abilities:
Super Electromagnetic Barrier  Combattler V creates a barrier of electricity around its body.
Smokescreen  Combattler V creates a normal smokescreen.

Slave Monsters
Galmus  This robotic monster appears in episode 1. Its powers include eye beams, spiked ball mode (allows for rolling, burrowing, spike bolts, and acts as a shield). This is the only Slave Monster other than Demon to appear in Super Robot Wars titles.
Zonbi  This robotic monster appears in episode 2. Its powers include melting and reforming and special containment armor (equipped with an extending mouth arms, a chest throwing star, a chest tentacle, and back disruptor waves).
Zenda  This robotic monster appears in episode 3. Its powers include atmospheric level jumping, teleportation, burrowing, duplication, saw-headed missiles from the mouth, levitation, and a heat wave by combining with duplicate.
Demoora  This robotic monster appears in episode 4. Its powers include burrowing, tentacles, body cannons that shoot explosive melting blobs, later upgraded to surpass barriers, section separation with missile launchers underneath, projectile absorbing body liquid.
Rasetsu This robotic monster appears in episode 5. Its powers include an orange heat ray from the mouth, tornado spawning propeller on the back, swords hidden in arm that can be combined to act like a boomerang, and a trident that acts like the spine.
Gorudaa  This robotic monster appears in episode 6. Its powers include sheer speed, two mace tails, missile launchers at each side of the mouth, and back spikes the launch like missiles.
Gyarudo  This robotic monster appears in episode 6. Its powers include explosive purple gas from the beak, squid whip tentacle that can spawn fire balls, a flamethrower from the beak, and can emit an electric surge.
Ika Gera  This robotic monster appears in episode 7. Its powers include swimming, mouth missiles which fire rockets from the sides, extend able limbs, drill fingers with three for each hand, spike missiles from the rotatable collar on the forehead, levitation, can emit an electric surge, regeneration, and morph the head into a drill.
Yasha  This robotic monster appears in episode 8. Its powers include flight, an extend-able spear that can split into two and regenerates, drill missiles from the mouth on the torso from a 4-tube missile launcher, and a torpedo disguised as the spine that is used after the head is removed.
Baby Kiiru  This robotic monster appears in episode 9 (starts as egg). Its only power is extraordinary jumping.
Adult Kiiru  This robotic monster appears in episode 9. Its powers include swimming, flames from the mouth, flight, orange eye lasers, head horns, coiling tail, and regeneration.
Gerudon  This robotic monster appears in episode 10. Its powers include flight, hurricane winds from ultra hard shield wings, flamethrower in mouth, mouth missiles, a retractable saw in the head, and razor feathers.
Kongurira  This robotic monster appears in episode 11. Its powers include concrete shoulder cannons, flight, wrist propellers, arm launch (retractable by chains), head spike missiles
Daiba  This robotic monster appears in episode 12. Its powers include twin laser swords that produce grid lasers in the form of a Greek Cross that will amplify in water and form web when touched together, swimming, flight at Mach 1, and head regeneration.
Supekutorudaa  This robotic monster appears in episode 13. Its powers include storage in lower half containing motorcyclist Campbellians, flamethrower hands, feet missiles, holographic projection from the head, three chest tubes for missile launchers and flamethrowers, pink eye lasers, stomach drill missiles, and a solar tornado by spinning limbs very fast while pink solar panels are erected.
Faidaa  This robotic monster appears in episode 14. Its powers include flight, bladed leg tips, mouth and nostril flamethrowers, webs from abdomen and mouth, dual missile launchers in abdomen, white eye lasers, and a spin attack.
Possessed Cosmo Bird  This robotic monster appears in episode 15. Its only power is flight at Mach 3.
Baribari  This robotic monster appears in episode 15. Its powers include mouth flames, retractable neck dish that releases an energy beam, a pink energy barrier, and a drill hidden in neck although the head blows up before usage, can be used for burrowing.
Geruzo  This robotic monster appears in episode 16. Its powers include dividing into four fighters, flight, yellow sonic crescents from wing), hurricane winds from wings, webs from the mouth, orange eye lasers that cause electric shock upon contact, Drill and needles from the wings.
Imitation Combattler V  This robotic monster appears in episode 17. Its powers include burrowing, orange eye lasers, rock fighter, and a rope ladder from the stomach. This robot was controlled by Slave Monster #512.
Zangyaru  This robotic monster appears in episode 17. Its powers include imitation Combattler V disguise, six pincer claw arms, pink lasers from eyes on torso, extend-able electric tentacles from the back, and a flamethrower from the mouth on the torso.
Gyaru  This robotic monster appears in episode 18. Its powers include flight, pink double helix bolts from the eyes, restrainer collars from abdomen sides that split in two and home in with grip by spikes and can be used as buzz saws, spike missiles from shoulders, four wrist spikes that spin like propellers and combine with restrainer collars as guided projectiles, regeneration, drill missiles from the chest, and pink sonic beams from holes in abdomen when a restrainer collar is removed.
Pe Rosu  This robotic monster appears in episode 18. Its powers include pink heat waves from the eyes, swimming, extend-able arms, pink antennae bolts, flight, and grapple claws from stomach.
New Trawl This robotic monster appears in episode 18. Its powers include flight and a yellow dis-integrator ray from computerized underside.
Barara This robotic monster appears in episode 19. Its powers include jawed flower tentacles that launch red spiked balls that can explode on contact, thorn vine necks, flight, and mutate by combining vines into an extend-able pair of arms, grow legs, explosive red spiked balls can be launched from the mouth.
Ganigamara  This robotic monster appears in episode 20. Its powers include flight, pincer claw hands, mouth flamethrower, teal beams from large eye and twin antennae eyes, 3-tube drill missile launcher hidden in abdomen, rotating magnetic missile turret on the back, and launch-able clamp claws that covers regular pincer claw hands.
Alpha  This robotic monster appears in episode 21. Its powers include crescent bladed lance, a shield that emits bright light, swimming, red mummy bandages from arms and legs that cause explosions and can used as distraction, flight, teal eye laser, reformation, telepathic communication, and a chained mace from the abdomen.
Beta  This robotic monster appears in episode 21. It was used nothing more than a flight capable Slave Monster used to test Alpha's abilities.
Airus  This robot appears in episode 22. Its powers include swimming, white freezing eye beams strong enough to freeze salt water and can cause explosions, a sword sheathed on left hip, and stone armor that keeps Airus under mind control. This is from the destroyed planet of Sigma in Sector 0865.
Golgo  This robotic monster appears in episode 22. It has five anthropomorphic skeleton bulls with powers on swimming, spears, and swords sheathed at the left hip.
Piraniyanga  This robotic monster appears in episode 23. Its powers include swimmer, purple mouth flames, maced extend-able tongue, teeth extension strong enough to destroy the Super Electromagnetic Yo-yo, a drill under each sole of the foot, and barbed spears hidden in pectorals.
Isogiran 1 This robotic monster appears in episode 24. Its powers include swimmer, tornado spawning from upper body, constricting tentacles that can morph into missiles at tips, and a spiked ball form. Inside of the mouth is very sensitive to projectiles.
Isogiran 2  This robotic monster appears in episode 24. Its powers include flight, slicing tentacles with tips that can turn into drills that can launch with a chain attached, pink electric bolts from green spots at tentacle tips, and orange stomach acid that can be vomited.
Demon  This robotic monster appears in episode 25. Its powers include flight, a sword that summons powerful green flames and has concealed spikes, toe missiles, three slicing sheets from each pectoral, lances from chest called the Drill Breast, self-destruct, fire summoning called the Corona Barrier, 3-tube missile launchers on each side of body with the missiles having internal spikes, hip missiles, launch-able wrist spikes, regeneration, and extend-able shoulder spikes. This Slave Monster was piloted by Mia. This is the only Slave Monster other than Garmusu to appear in Super Robot Wars titles.
Lava Cobra  This robotic monster appears in episode 26. This is nothing more than a six headed fire breathing snake Slave Monster guard that Combattler V tests the Grand Dasher on.
Dormane  These robots appears in episode 26. These are large stone heads that guard Oreana capable on levitation and powerful flamethrowers in their mouths.
Great Garuda This robotic monster appears in episode 26. Its powers include swimming, bow and missile arrows that explode after contact, 3-tube missile launcher in chest, mouth flamethrower, chainsaw sword hidden in right hand, and drill missiles hidden in the right arm.

Magma Beasts
After episode 26 a new type of monsters called Magma Beasts are used until the end of the series. All Magma Beasts have a high resistance to heat due to their origination in a lava pit and have an escape port for Dungele's escape capsule.

Mechanical Cockroach  This robots appears in episode 27. These are simple robot cockroaches that consume metal. Alcohol works like acid on them.
Magnum  This robotic monster appears in episode 27. Its powers include flight, rocket launchers hidden in arms, 4-tube missile launcher in chest, armor that can stand up to the super electromagnetic yo-yo, pink double helix beams from the two rods in chest, freezing mist from the mouth, spike shoulder beams, fire balls from eye-like structure beneath face, and body spin that counters the Super Electromagnetic Spin. This is one of the few Magma Beasts to appear in Super Robot War titles.
Gill  This robotic monster appears in episode 28. Its powers include flight, shoulder buzz saws that can be used in buzz saw mode which is done by sealing main body within shoulders and retracting arms, left arm 12-barrel gun that shoots explosive pink mace particles, a pink heat ray from the right hand, green sonic waves from inside of shoulder buzzsaws, and regeneration.
Zakurosu  This robotic monster appears in episode 29. Its powers include egg reduction, flight with speed increasing when inhaling oxygen, two toe claws on each foot, twin neck spikes that can launch like missiles, extend-able arms on wings while the fingers can come together to form drills, wind gusts from the mouth, a large drill morphed from the head, nets from egg-like capsules fired from the mouth on the torso, and launch-able razor feathers from the left wing).
Burungen  This robotic monster appears in episode 30. Its powers include ultrasonic waves that disintegrate objects, vibration bullets from spinning section of head that look like trilobites, burrowing, and four gravitation tails on the body used for whipping and can also extend.
Moguma 1  This robotic monster appears in episode 31. Its powers include 2-tube missile launchers from underside of each section on centipede-like body that can also fire suction cups with wire attachment, a drill in the mouth, green sonic beams from the eye, extendable spear legs, extraordinary jumping, super electromagnetic energy absorbing from the generator in the neck, and form a cocoon from absorbed energy that can also burrow.
Moguma 2  This robotic monster appears in episode 31. Its powers include spiked tail, flight, spiked whip sheathed in each shoulders, a drill in the mouth, green eye lasers, super electromagnetic energy absorb, six chest spike missiles, and extend-able limbs and neck.
Mammoth  This robotic monster appears in episode 32. Its powers include freezing touch that even freezes lava, flight, ice missiles from twin trunks and mouth, icicles from twin trunk after sucking in water, ear swords, detachable tusks that are used like sickles strong enough to break the Twin Lancers, and Magma Beast chainsaw that is a pair of buzz saws from knees that can fly. This is one of the few Magma Beasts to appear in Super Robot War titles.
Faian  This robotic monster appears in episode 33. Its powers include swimming, corona crash which is body heat that boils naval battle ships, Faian bomb which is launching fist with immense heat, body form by the temperature of the head melting the land into a new body, semi-solid body that makes it extremely difficult to damage, Faian screw which entraps enemies in fire tornado, and a yellow heat ray from the middle eye.
Pteragirasu  This robotic monster appears in episode 34. Its powers include flight, slicing wings, two wing missiles under each wing, a blue energy beam from the mouth, and helicopter blades in the chest that is used once wings are detached.
Gadon  This robotic monster appears in episode 35. Its powers include burrowing, pink horn bolts, pincer claw hands that can be launched and emit an electric shock, and regeneration.
Doroon  This robotic monster appears in episode 36. Its powers include flight, body spin that creates illusions, detachable pincer claw hands, neck hole spike that is used after retracting head, detachable feet with sharp clawed toes that each having two launch-able blades), a sword in each arm, and a sickle in each leg that is launch-able and can regenerate.
Demekazera  This robotic monster appears in episode 37. Its powers include reformation, a green heat ray from the eye, and cutter beam which is an electric surge from the body spikes.
Mechanical Frog  These robots appears in episode 38. They are disguised as regular frogs equipped with drills in their mouths and can combine into the Giant Mechanical Frog.
Giant Mechanical Frog  This robotic monster appears in episode 38. Its powers include mouth flames, an extend-able spiked tongue, extraordinary jumping, and levitation.
Frogii  This robotic monster appears in episode 38. Its powers include swimming, a large mace for the right arm, pink energy beam from the mouth, purple eye beams, mouth missiles, flight, projectile consumption, mouth flames, and regeneration.
Dakondaa  This robotic monster appears in episode 39. Its powers include a 5-shot flamethrower in the chest that launches fire balls that contain magma, an orange eye laser, three extend-able drills near each shoulder, a retractable head, palm missiles, a grapple claw hidden in the eye, throwing stars launched from spinning belt, a spiral laser cannon hidden in the torso that can replace the head after it retracts), and an electric tornado from the head and torso.
Marionera  This robotic monster appears in episode 40. Its powers include a controlling a copy of itself, swimmer, splitting the body into four pieces, toe missiles, finger missiles, a leg blade at outermost side of legs, bladed bracelets that are used like buzzsaws and can be launched, regeneration, and forearm blades
Doringaa  This robotic monster appears in episode 41. Its powers include a barrier dome that is an electrified force field that breaks up from loud noise from the inside, flight, pellet bombs from the shoulders, fire balls from cannon in scalp and two in the torso, knuckle bomb which is rocket punching, a drill gun hidden in the right arm, and a sword in the left arm. It highly resembles Getter Robo.
Harinezuraa  This robotic monster appears in episode 42. Its powers include flight, detachable spiked armor that can form a snake-like chainsaw, twin claw fingers for each hand, spike missiles from the back, a drill tongue, launch-able ear swords that regenerate, and ball mode where it is surrounded in more layers of spiked armor.
Blue Ultra Magma Beast Sirius Kiba  This robotic monster appears in episode 43. Its powers include fanged sabers, flight, static cloud emit, speed, size increase, and combine with Sirius Garo. This is one of the few Magma Beasts to appear in Super Robot War titles.
Red Ultra Magma Beast Sirius Garo  This robotic monster appears in episode 43. Its powers include fanged sabers, flight, speed, fire emit, size increase, and combine with Sirius Kiba. This is one of the few Magma Beasts to appear in Super Robot War titles.
Daruto  This robotic monster appears in episode 43. Its powers include swimming, a mace for the right arm, and flight. This was killed off by Sirius Kiba and Sirius Garo after Dungele disobeys Empress Janera's orders.
Big Sirius  This robotic monster appears in episode 43. Its powers include flight, fire and static cloud emit, sharp claws, fanged sabers, and a mace tail. This is one of the few Magma Beasts to appear in Super Robot War titles.
Adult Mazaan  This robotic monster appears in episode; 44; highly resembles Godzilla.
Infant Mazaan  This robotic monster appears in episode 44; highly resembles Minilla.
Cybernetically Enhanced Mazaan  This robotic monster appears in episode 44. Its powers include a 4-tube missile launcher in the chest, mouth flamethrower, miniature UFOs that shoot cyan lasers, extend-able nail claws sharp enough to tear through Combattler V, poisonous gas from the mouth, and holograms of itself. It highly resembles Mechagodzilla.
Scalp  This robotic monster appears in episode 45. Its powers include flight, scalp dash which is where the splits body at the waist in half wit each half growing limbs, and powers of both halves. It highly resembles Native Americans.
Scalp Upper Half  Its powers include flight, Shire (boomerang ax), Apache (detaches legs and used as spinning club), Comache (pair of axes attached by a chain), Homing Slicing Feathers (from headdress)
Scalp Lower Half  Its powers include flight, bow and arrows (arrows can split into two), arm blades (at sides of wrist), scalp missiles (one from each pectoral), Mouth Flamethrower, Twin Whips, Geranimo (regenerates upper half)
Waninga  This robotic monster appears in episode 46. Its powers include flight, mouth flamethrower, green heat ray from the eyes, drill missiles from the mouth, buzz saw mode, launchable back spikes, extend-able arms that can create electric surge, and regeneration.
Hitodengaa  This robotic monster appears in episode 47. This was killed off at beginning by the Super Electromagnetic Spin.
Kaningaa  This robotic monster appears in episode 47. Its powers include a blue electric ray from the dish on the chest, flight, extending grapple claw arms, face missiles launchers, arm drills, toe lasers, body spin, and chest tentacles that can release electric shocks.
Sakyuun  This robotic monster appears in episode 48. Its powers include swimming, homing missile launchers in the chest, bladed tops launched from chest (possible inspiration for Voltes V's Super Electromagnetic Tops), battle machine capture used during combining by splitting in five pieces like Combattler V, a machine gun in each arm, stinger missiles from the arms, arm drills, fire balls from the  mouth, 3-tube missile launcher in chest, a sword in each arm that can easily slice through Combattler V, and self-destructing.
Ikarosuta  This robotic monster appears in episode 49. Its powers include flight, electric barrier drones stored in chest and are used to create electric webs, dagger missiles from the mouth and tail, pink forehead beams, launch-able maces from the three cannons in each wing that shoot daggers shortly after being launched, electric webs from forehead, pink electric bolts from the tail, and electric surges.
Snake Pattern A  This robotic monster appears in episode 50; Its powers include flight, swimming, buzz saw mode, neck missile launcher, fangs, launch-able back spikes, mouth flamethrower, a green heat ray from the neck, launch-able scales from the underside, and snake spin which is an electric drill from mouth that causes body to spin like the Super Electromagnetic Spin. It highly resembles a cobra.
Snake Pattern B  This robotic monster appears in episode 50; Its powers include flight, extend-able wings that have armor that reflects attacks like the V Laser, pincer claw tail, launch-able mandibles, and regeneration. It resembles a cockroach.
Snake Pattern C  This robotic monster appears in episode 50. Its powers include flight and hurricane gusts from wing flapping. It resembles a bat.
Robat  This robotic monster appears in episode 50. Its powers include signal jamming by using sound waves from mouth cannon and flight. This is essentially the Campbellian version of Ropet.
Hagemezura  This robotic monster appears in episode 51. Its powers include swimming, sword with sheath on back, fire balls from the mouth, pink eye beams, and two giant throwing stars that act like boomerangs.
Great 1  This robotic monster appears in episode 52. Its powers include flight, blue eye lasers, magma phantom which creates illusions, 2-tube missile launchers on the chest, propeller spinning arms, launchable mouth spikes that drain energy and has stronger versions on the head, four swords used in propeller fashion after arms retract, and reform. This is one of the few Magma Beasts to appear in Super Robot War titles.
Great 2 This robotic monster appears in episode 52. Its powers include flight, magma dissolve which turns into magma that can spawn weapons while in this form, 2-tube missile launcher in chest, high body heat that can melt the Twin Lancers, rocket punch that includes propeller-like bracelets on each wrist, magma crush which turns arms and knees into fire for restraining, magma dryer which is a very strong heat ray from the mouth, magma storm which is a heat ray from the body, and a  launch-able drill horn on the forehead. This is one of the few Magma Beasts to appear in Super Robot War titles.
Masurupon  This robotic monster appears in episodes 53 and briefly in 54. Its powers include flight, whipping tentacle limbs, propeller missiles from tentacle ends that release heat wave after being impact, homing tentacle bits that act like missiles, regeneration using metal structures, belly missiles, tick bomb from mouth that attaches to objects and explodes with immense force, green belly beams, and mouth missiles. These are the only mass production Magma Beasts in the series and are one of the few to appear in Super Robot War titles.
Darkuron  This robotic monster appears in episode 53. Its powers include flight, 3-tube missile launchers disguised as feet, and drill snake mode. This was piloted by Warchimades. This is one of the few Magma Beasts to appear in Super Robot War titles.
Indora  This robotic monster appears in episode 54. Its powers include flight, extendable drill nose, twin mouth missiles, launch-able saw-headed ears that explode after contact, regeneration, and a grappling claw in the chest.
Ashura  This robotic monster appears in episode 54. Its powers include flight, twin mouth missiles, buffalo horns, and green horn bolts.
Masu  This robotic monster appears in episode 54. Its powers include flight, twin mouth missiles, grapple claw in chest, and a green heat ray from the mouth.
Three-Side  This robotic monster appears in episode 54. Its powers include flight, long tail, grapple claw in mouth and for arms with cables strong enough to break the Cutter Kick, palm drills on the lower set of arms, extend-able buzz saw shoulders, body split at the waist, 6-tube missile launcher on chest, and belly missiles. This was created from the combination of Indora, Ashura, and Masu.

Campbellian vehicles
Graydon (aka Gereidon)  Garuda's attack saucer. Its powers include slave monster production, missiles from its top, levitation even underwater, an underside tractor beam, teleportation, a buzzsaw hidden in one of six wings, and a pink heat ray.
Bromber  Warchamides' attack saucer. Powers include levitation even underwater, an underside tractor beam, yellow eye lasers, and missile launchers at the midsection.
Santomagma  Empress Janera's warship used in the final episode. Its powers include flight, armor strong enough to deflect the Super Electromagnetic Spin, tornadoes from its underside, spike missiles from the carapace, mouth flamethrower, freezing wind from front and side mouths, launch-able front and side heads, Fangs strong enough to break the Battle Gulegger, and laser beam bolts from all four heads.

Other robots
Gargantua  This European robot appears in episode 18. Its powers include flight, a double sided lance that can be used as a boomerang, and a laser gatling gun on the chest. An upgraded version called the Pantagruel appears in Super Robot Wars 3.
Simulation Robot  This robot appears in episode 29. Its powers include wrist swords and flight.
Kerot  This robot appears in episode 30 onward. Its powers include jumping, Gum Gum Gun (firing white gum bits from the mouth), Bubble Gun (bubbles from a straw in the mouth), Super Top (extendable tongue with top at the end of it), Sky Fork (three forks on ropes from tongue), Kerot Kick (typical aerial kick), a Combattler V Replica used in episode 33 (equipped with fake super electromagnetic yo-yos, fake rock fighters, and can execute a "Kerot Punch"), and a pair of fireworks cannons from the mouth.
Pantagruel  A Banpresto original that appeared in Super Robot Wars 3 for the Super Famicom based on Gargantua.

External links
Combattler V at IMDB

Super robot anime and manga
Lists of anime and manga characters